Box is an unincorporated community and census-designated place in Sequoyah County, Oklahoma, United States. Its population was 224 as of the 2010 census. Oklahoma State Highway 82 passes through the community.

Box was previously known as Roy; its post office changed its name to Box on July 7, 1911, after resident Henry Box. The post office closed on February 29, 1928.

Geography

Demographics

References

Unincorporated communities in Sequoyah County, Oklahoma
Unincorporated communities in Oklahoma
Census-designated places in Sequoyah County, Oklahoma
Census-designated places in Oklahoma